Comedy Albums is a Billboard chart that lists the "top-selling spoken word and musical comedy albums" each week, as ranked by sales data compiled by Nielsen SoundScan. The chart debuted as Top Comedy Albums in October 2004 (simultaneously with Top Rap Albums chart) when it was published for the first time exclusively in Billboard's websites. The first number-one album on the Top Comedy Albums chart was Lord, I Apologize by Larry the Cable Guy. The most recent number-one is Inside: The Songs, by Bo Burnham. As of issue dated March 4, 2023, it has topped the chart for 87 weeks, debuting at #1 on June 19, 2021. 

Its Billboard Year-End chart has been active since 2006.

On May 16, 2014, Billboard published "Top 20 Best Selling Comedy Albums".

References

External links
Current Billboard Comedy Albums chart link

Billboard charts
Comedy albums
2010s in comedy